Aston Football Club is a football club based in England.

History
The club was established in 2006 and joined Division Three of the Midland Combination from the Birmingham AFA. They were promoted to Division Two at the end of their first season after finishing as runners-up. Another runners-up finish in 2011–12 led to the club being promoted to Division One. When the Midland Combination merged with the Midland Alliance in 2014, Aston were placed in Division Two of the new league. They made their FA Vase début in 2014 and were briefly confused for Premier League team Aston Villa by Soccerbase.

Aston left the league after the 2014–15 season and dropped back into the renamed Birmingham & District League. The club were champions of Division Six in 2016–17, after which they were promoted to Division Four.

Honours
Birmingham & District League
Division Six champions 2017–18

Records
Best FA Vase performance: First Round 2014–15

References

External links

Football clubs in England
Football clubs in Birmingham, West Midlands
Football clubs in the West Midlands (county)
2006 establishments in England
Association football clubs established in 2006
Midland Football Combination
Midland Football League
Birmingham & District Football League